The 8th Parliament of Solomon Islands, determined by the 2006 general election, was the National Parliament of Solomon Islands from 2006 to 2010. It was preceded by the seventh and followed by the ninth.

The 8th Parliament consisted in 50 representatives, elected from 50 single-seat constituencies.

Party standings
The various parties had the following number of seats.

Members
The following were the 50 members of the National Parliament.

 to be completed

Changes in membership
The following MPs obtained their seats through by-elections during the term of the 8th Parliament.

 Walter Folotalu was elected MP for Lau Mbaelelea in a by-election on 23 September 2008.
 Manasseh Maelanga was elected MP for East Malaita in a by-election on 27 March 2008.
 Silas Milikada was elected MP for East Honiara in a by-election on 23 September 2008.
 Matthew Cooper Wale was elected MP for Aoke-Langalanga in a by-election on 27 March 2008.
 Peter Shanel Agovaka was re-elected MP for Central Guadalcanal in a by-election on 6 May 2009.
 Allan Kemakeza was re-elected MP for Savo and Russells in a by-election on 29 October 2009. However, in February 2010, the High Court ruled that Allan Kemakeza was ineligible to stand in the by-election and the seat then remained vacant for the remainder of the term of the 8th Parliament.

Legislation
The following Acts were enacted under the Eighth Parliament.
 2006 Supplementary Appropriation Act
 Gaming and Lotteries (Amendment) Act 2006
 2007 Appropriation Act
 Governors-General (Pensions and Benefits) Act 2007
 Income Tax (Amendment) Act 2007
 Statistics (Amendment) Act 2007
 2007 Supplementary Appropriation Act
 Magistrate Courts (Amendment) Act 2007
 State Owned Enterprises Act 2007
 Correctional Services Act 2007
 Prescription of Ministers (Amendment) Act 2007
 Prescription of Parliamentary Privileges, Immunities and Powers Act 2007
 2008 Appropriation Act
 Mines and Minerals (Amendment) Act 2008
 2008 Supplementary Appropriation Act
 Truth And Reconciliation Commission Act 2008
 Secured Transaction Act 2008
 Correctional Services (Amendment) Act 2008
 2009 Appropriation Act (2008)
 2008 Supplementary Appropriation (No.2) Act
 Constitution (Amendment) Act 2008
 College of Higher Education (Amendment) Act 2008
 Companies Act 2009
 Companies (Insolvency and Receivership) Act 2009
 National Transport Fund Act 2009
 Civil Aviation (Amendment) Act 2009
 Fisheries (Amendment) Act 2009
 Maritime Safety Administration Act 2009
 Valuers Act 2009
 Interpretation and General Provision (Validation and Indemnity) Act 2009
 Constitution (Amendment) Act 2009
 Traffic (Amendment) Act 2009
 Evidence Act 2009
 Counter-Terrorsm Act 2009
 Foreign Investment (Amendment and Validation) Act 2009
 Penalties Miscellaneous (Amendments) Act 2009
 Currency Declaration Act 2009
 Constitution (Amendment)(No.2) Act 2009
 2009 Supplementary Appropriation Act
 Criminal Procedure Code (Amendment) Act 2009
 Customs Valuation Act 2009
 Telecommunications Act 2009
 Facilitation of International Assistance (Amendment) Act 2009
 2009 Supplementary Appropriation (No. 2) Act
 Truth and Reconciliation Commission (Amendment) Act 2009
 2010 Appropriation Act (2009)
 North New Georgia Timber Corporation (Amendment) Act 2010
 Tobacco Control Act 2010
 Extradition Act 2010
 Protected Areas Act 2010
 National Parliament Electoral Provisions (Amendment) Act 2010
 Money Laundering and Proceeds of Crime (Amendment) Act 2010
 Accountants Act 2010

References

See also
 9th Parliament of Solomon Islands
 7th Parliament of Solomon Islands

Politics of the Solomon Islands
Government of the Solomon Islands
National Parliament of the Solomon Islands
2006 establishments in the Solomon Islands
2010 disestablishments in the Solomon Islands